Events in the year 1999 in Monaco.

Incumbents 
 Monarch: Rainier III
 State Minister: Michel Lévêque

Events 
 23 January – Princess Caroline of Monaco married Ernst August, Prince of Hanover in a civil ceremony at the Palace. It was also the 42nd birthday of the princess bride.
 2 March – AS Monaco made it to the fourth qualifying round of the 1999-2000 UEFA Cup. They lost to RCD Mallorca, 4-1.
 9 March – AS Monaco played a second match against RCD Mallorca, this time on their home turf at Stade Louis II in Fontvieille, and won, 1-0.
 16 May – Michael Schumacher won the 1999 Monaco Grand Prix.
 20 July – A daughter, Alexandra, was born to the Prince and Princess of Hanover. Prince Ernst was photographed by paparazzi urinating outside the hospital in Vöcklabruck.

Deaths

See also 

 1999 in Europe
 City states

References 

 
Years of the 20th century in Monaco
1990s in Monaco
Monaco
Monaco